The Casma Group is a stratigraphic group of Cretaceous (Albian to Cenomanian) sedimentary formations exposed along the coast and within the Cordillera Occidental near Casma, Peru.

Description 
The sediments of the Casma Group reflect deposition in two distinct environments of the West Peruvian Basin. Some sediments were deposited near the Casma Volcanic Arc in an intra-cratonic sedimentary basin that was occasionally connected to the ocean. Other sediments were deposited in what was once a continental platform bounded by reefs and with anoxic pockets.

Together with the Morro Solar and Imperial Groups, the Casma Group contains clastic volcanosedimentary material derivative of the Mesozoic Casma Volcanic Arc. The folding of the Casma Group sediments is the result of the Cretaceous Mochica Phase of the Andean orogeny. The group is intruded by plutons of the Coastal Batholith of Peru.

The Casma Group include the following lithologies: gypsum, limestone, marl, tuff, lava flows, sandstone and conglomerate.

References

Bibliography 
 
 

Geologic groups of South America
Geologic formations of Peru
Lower Cretaceous Series of South America
Upper Cretaceous Series of South America
Cretaceous Peru
Cretaceous volcanism
Albian Stage
Cenomanian Stage
Limestone formations
Marl formations
Sandstone formations
Conglomerate formations
Tuff formations
Geography of Ancash Region
Geography of Lima Region